Juan Carlos Guzmán-Betancourt (born 1976) is a Colombian impostor and conman. Guzmán is believed to have stolen at least $1 million in various countries. He has used at least ten different false identities and has been pursued in Colombia, Venezuela, Mexico, Canada, Russia, Thailand and Japan.

Early life
Guzmán was born in 1976 in Roldanillo, Colombia. On June 4, 1993, he traveled to Miami as a wheel-well stowaway, calling himself Guillermo Rosales. As an unnamed male, "13 years old", he was listed in the FAA report on flights with stowaways.

Criminal record
Betancourt was first arrested in the United Kingdom in 1998 on suspicion of four burglaries at Le Méridien Piccadilly Hotel, and of using a stolen credit card. In the U.S. states of Virginia and New York, Guzmán was convicted of larceny and credit card fraud in Florida, being deported from the U.S. three times.

References

External links
Initial story by The New York Times

Podcast Episode by "Scamfluencers"

1976 births 
Colombian criminals
Impostors 
People from Valle del Cauca Department 
Living people
People convicted of burglary
People convicted of fraud
People convicted of theft
Stowaways